The following lists events that happened during 1921 in Chile.

Incumbents
President of Chile: Arturo Alessandri

Events

March
13 March – Chilean parliamentary election, 1921

Births
8 March – Sergio Onofre Jarpa (d. 2020)
8 June – Carlos González Cruchaga (d. 2008)
16 July – Nilo Floody (d. 2013)
15 October – Fernando Roldán (d. 2019)

Deaths 
date unknown – Policarpo Toro (b. 1851)

References 

 
Years of the 20th century in Chile
Chile